Audrius Kšanavičius (born 28 January 1977) is a footballer who plays for FBK Kaunas as a midfielder.

Career
A left winger, Kšanavičius began his career with FBK Kaunas in 1994, making over 150 appearances before moving to Latvian champions Skonto Riga in 2001. After three seasons with Skonto he returned to FBK Kaunas. He spent the 2005 season on loan to Atlantas Klaipėda. He joined Scottish Premier League club Hearts on a six-month loan in July 2007 after featuring in the club's 3–1 friendly defeat by FC Barcelona. He scored his first league goal for Hearts in a 4–2 win over Falkirk on 6 October. On 11 March 2008, he signed a new contract that extended his loan at Hearts until June 2009, before joining the club permanently in the summer. On 3 August, Kšanavičius scored the only goal of a 1–0 pre-season friendly win for Hearts over Premier League new boys Hull, and then six days later he scored his second league goal for Hearts as they beat Motherwell 3–2. On 8 January 2009, having found himself out of favour under Csaba László, Hearts announced that Kšanavičius had returned to FBK Kaunas after 18 months with the Tynecastle club.

International goals
Scores and results list. Lithuania's goal tally first.

References

External links

1977 births
Living people
Place of birth missing (living people)
Lithuanian footballers
Lithuania international footballers
Association football midfielders
Lithuanian expatriate footballers
FBK Kaunas footballers
FK Atlantas players
FK Kauno Žalgiris players
Skonto FC players
Heart of Midlothian F.C. players
A Lyga players
Latvian Higher League players
Scottish Premier League players
Expatriate footballers in Latvia
Expatriate footballers in Scotland
Lithuanian expatriate sportspeople in Latvia
Lithuanian expatriate sportspeople in Scotland